Gliricidia maculata is a species of fast-growing leguminous tree in the family Fabaceae, native to southeastern Mexico, Belize, and Guatemala. It is often considered a synonym of Gliricidia sepium and shares many of its common names and uses. It is used to provide shade for growing tea, coffee, and cocoa, as a green manure, as a forage, particularly for goats and sheep, and in living fences.

References

Robinieae
Forages
Flora of Southeastern Mexico
Flora of Belize
Flora of Guatemala
Plants described in 1840